Bosoughan is a village in Cornwall, England, United Kingdom, approximately three miles (5 km) east of Newquay. According to the Post Office the population at the 2011 Census was included in the civil parish of Colan.

References

External links

Villages in Cornwall